The James Brothers of Missouri is a 1949 American Republic Western film serial.

Cast
 Keith Richards as Jesse James
 Robert Bice as Frank James
 Noel Neill as Peg Royer
 Roy Barcroft as Ace Marlin
 Patricia Knox as Belle Calhoun
 Lane Bradford as Monk Tucker

Production
The James Brothers of Missouri was budgeted at $164,986 although the final negative cost was $164,757 (a $229, or 0.1%, under spend).

It was filmed between 6 July and 27 July 1949. The serial's production number was 1705.

Stunts
 David Sharpe
 Tom Steele
 Dale Van Sickel

Special effects
Special effects were created by the Lydecker brothers.

Release

Theatrical
The James Brothers of Missouri'''s official release date is 31 August 1949, although this is actually the date the sixth chapter was made available to film exchanges.

Critical reception
William C. Cline, author of In the Nick of Time: Motion Picture Sound Serials, dismisses this serial as a "quick warm-over" of the first two Jesse James serials.

Chapter titles
 Frontier Renegades (20min)
 Racing Peril (13min 20s)
 Danger Road (13min 20s)
 Murder at Midnight (13min 20s)
 Road to Oblivion (13min 20s)
 Missouri Manhunt (13min 20s)
 Hangman's Noose (13min 20s)
 Coffin on Wheels (13min 20s)
 Dead Man's Return (13min 20s)
 Galloping Gunslingers (13min 20s) - a re-cap chapter
 The Haunting Past (13min 20s)
 Fugitive's Code (13min 20s)
Source:

See also
 Jesse James Rides Again (1947) - earlier Jesse James serial
 Adventures of Frank and Jesse James'' (1948) - earlier Jesse James serial
 List of film serials by year
 List of film serials by studio

References

External links

 
 

1946 films
1949 Western (genre) films
1949 films
American black-and-white films
Biographical films about Jesse James
1940s English-language films
Republic Pictures film serials
Films directed by Fred C. Brannon
American Western (genre) films
1940s American films